Avery Saltzman (born 17 June, 1956), is a Canadian actor and theater director.  He is artistic director of the Harold Green Jewish Theatre. Saltzman was born and raised in Toronto, Ontario.

Notes

External links
 https://web.archive.org/web/20080703182021/http://www.averysaltzman.com/
 http://www.hgjewishtheatre.com/index.html

Living people
Male actors from Toronto
Canadian male film actors
Canadian male television actors
Canadian male stage actors
Jewish Canadian male actors
1956 births